The Louis J. Bailey Branch Library is a historic Carnegie library building located at Gary, Indiana. It was built in 1918, and is a one-story, Colonial Revival style brick building on a raised basement.  It has a slate gable roof and projecting entrance block with Corinthian order pilasters.  The building was constructed with a $25,000 grant from the Carnegie Foundation. Beginning in 1919, it housed the Gary International Institute in the building's basement. The branch closed about 1963.

It was listed on the National Register of Historic Places in 2004 as the Louis J. Bailey Branch Library-Gary International Institute.

References

Carnegie libraries in Indiana
Libraries on the National Register of Historic Places in Indiana
Colonial Revival architecture in Indiana
Library buildings completed in 1918
Buildings and structures in Gary, Indiana
National Register of Historic Places in Gary, Indiana